Coteau Rouge is a 2011 French-Canadian (Quebec) film written and directed by André Forcier and produced by Les Films du Paria.

Synopsis 
Another offbeat comedy from André Forcier about the Blanchard family, a tightknit group living in Coteau Rouge on the south shore of St. Lawrence (the film was shot in Longueuil). The grandfather of the clan (Paolo Noël) was once a fisherman who used to get rid of bodies for the mob. His son (Lepage) runs the local gas station and he has two children, Hélène (Céline Bonnier) and Henri. Hélène is childless, so her mother (Louise Laparé) is carrying her baby; meanwhile, her husband (Roy Dupuis), an unscrupulous entrepreneur, wants to buy up the land to build an up-scale condo.

The film won Best Canadian Film at the Montreal World Film Festival.

References

External links
 

2011 films
Films set in Quebec
Films directed by André Forcier
Culture of Longueuil
French-language Canadian films
2010s Canadian films
Canadian drama films